The 1976 KFK competitions in Ukraine were part of the 1976 Soviet KFK competitions that were conducted in the Soviet Union. It was 12th season of the KFK in Ukraine since its introduction in 1964.

First stage

Group 1

Group 2

Group 3

Group 4

Group 5

Final

References

Ukrainian Football Amateur League seasons
KFK